Orchestral Works by Tomas Svoboda (sometimes abridged as Orchestral Works) is a classical music album by the Oregon Symphony under the artistic direction of James DePreist, released by the record label Albany in 2003. The album was recorded at the Arlene Schnitzer Concert Hall in Portland, Oregon during three performances in January and June 2000. It contains three works by Tomáš Svoboda, a Czech-American composer who taught at Portland State University for more than 25 years: Overture of the Season, Op. 89; Concerto for Marimba and Orchestra, Op. 148; and Symphony No. 1 (of Nature), Op. 20. The album's executive producers were Peter Kermani, Susan Bush, and Mark B. Rulison; Blanton Alspaugh served as the recording producer.

Overture of the Season and Concerto for Marimba and Orchestra were commissioned by the Oregon Symphony. The latter was dedicated to principal percussionist Niel DePonte, who encouraged Svoboda to compose the work and who is featured on marimba; it was the first concerto commissioned by the orchestra for one of its musicians. Though the album received a mixed critical reception, DePonte's performance earned him a Grammy Award nomination for Best Instrumental Soloist Performance with Orchestra. Selected tracks from the album have been broadcast by classical music radio stations throughout the United States.

Background and composition

Orchestral Works by Tomas Svoboda, released by Albany Records in July 2003, was recorded under the artistic direction of James DePreist and contains three works by Czech-American composer Tomáš Svoboda: Overture of the Season, Op. 89; Concerto for Marimba and Orchestra, Op. 148; and Symphony No. 1 (of Nature), Op. 20. Svoboda has been regarded as Oregon's "most prolific and performed" classical composer. Following his education at the Prague Conservatory (1954–1962), the Academy of Music in Prague (1962–1964) and the University of Southern California (1966–1969), Svoboda taught composition and music theory at Portland State University for more than 25 years.

Overture of the Season and Concerto for Marimba and Orchestra were recorded at the Arlene Schnitzer Concert Hall in downtown Portland on January 9–10, 2000; Symphony No. 1 was recorded at the same venue on June 13, 2000. Concerto for Marimba and Orchestra features principal percussionist Niel DePonte, who joined the orchestra in 1977 at age 24, on marimba. Peter Kermani, Susan Bush and Mark B. Rulison served as the album's executive producers. Blanton Alspaugh served as the recording producer. John Newton was the recording engineer, and mastering was conducted by Mark Donahue. Svoboda is credited for the album's cover art. The album's liner notes also credit Wendy Leher, Pavlina Honcova-Summers and Henry Hillman for photography, and Dave McLaughlin for graphic design. Mixing console mastering occurred at Soundmirror, based in Massachusetts.

The recording was funded by Mary Ausplund Tooze, a longtime philanthropist and patron of Portland's arts community, who specifically requested the inclusion of Concerto for Marimba and Orchestra for being a "good, solid piece and one you find out more about each time you hear it". Tooze considered the concerto the "real star" of the recording.

Works
Overture of the Season was commissioned by the Oregon Symphony for its 83rd season; the work's world premiere was presented by the orchestra on October 7, 1978. In 1994, the classical music writer for Philadelphia Daily News said the composition had been performed by 55 orchestras within the three previous seasons. According to Svoboda's website, as of May 2013 the work has been performed 270 times by 141 orchestras, under the direction of 93 conductors. The "festive" overture, which is approximately eight minutes in length, employs flutes, piccolo, oboes, clarinets, bassoons, horns, trumpets, trombones, tuba, timpani, percussion, and strings.

Concerto for Marimba and Orchestra was commissioned by the orchestra in 1993 in conjunction with its centennial celebration. It features solo marimba and a "keyboard" quintet (piano, harp, celeste, orchestra bells and crotales), with parts for flutes, piccolo, oboes, clarinets, bassoons, horns, trumpets, trombones, tuba, timpani, and strings. According to Svoboda, the work took a year to compose and marks the first concerto commissioned by the Oregon Symphony for one of its musicians. Concerto for Marimba and Orchestra is dedicated to DePonte, who encouraged Svoboda to compose a marimba concerto. For the album's liner notes, Svoboda wrote:

When the concerto is performed, according to Svoboda, instruments on stage are separated into three contrasting sections: the solo marimba, the quintet, and the remainder of the orchestra. The quintet is placed near the conductor and solo marimba, "which is the prominent voice of this uncommon ensemble". The composition contains several instances where the quintet plays for extended periods, referred to as "islands" by Svoboda, which create "concerto grosso-like interplay" with the orchestra.

Symphony No. 1 was completed in 1956 and premiered in Prague on September 7, 1957. Inspired by Svoboda's exposure to nature within a pastoral setting, the composition was commissioned anonymously 25 years later (1982), providing Svoboda an opportunity to make revisions. The work was influenced by Ludwig van Beethoven, Antonín Dvořák, and Pyotr Ilyich Tchaikovsky; it features polyphonic textures and asymmetrical and harmonic rhythmic elements. The symphony consists of four movements: "Moderato", "Presto", "Andante", and "Allegro – Moderato". The first, considered a chorale, is in the key of C-sharp minor and features a theme performed by flute. The second movement, a scherzo, features a "quick, motoric" triple rhythm and meter. The third is a pastorale that highlights the woodwind section and incorporates a piece called "The Bird", composed by Svoboda in 1949 at age nine. The final movement, a rondo, was influenced by Czech folk music and mixes themes supplied by earlier movements.

Reception and broadcasts

The album received a mixed reception. Blair Sanderson of AllMusic found Svoboda's compositions to be imitative, specifically comparing Overture of the Season to work by Leoš Janáček and Symphony No. 1 to "equal parts" of Hugo Alfvén and Jean Sibelius, with "just a dash" of Carl Nielsen. Sanderson criticized the harmonic language of Concerto for Marimba and Orchestra and found DePonte's performance to be admirable but "weakly planned". Similarly, Robert Dettmer of Classical CD Review found Svoboda's work to be derivative and "expressively sterile", and "no more engaging than any other marimba concerto". However, Dettmer acknowledged that the marimba was one of his least favorite solo instruments. Dettmer wrote that DePriest "serves the composer dutifully, but not as enliveningly as one might have expected".

For his marimba performance, DePonte earned a Grammy Award nomination for Best Instrumental Soloist Performance with Orchestra, the first time that the Oregon Symphony or any of its musicians had been recognized by the Recording Academy. Following the announcement, DePonte admitted that he was surprised by the nomination and had not felt similar emotions since learning of his invitation to join the orchestra 26 years earlier: "I am completely overwhelmed. I had no idea the recording had been submitted." DePriest said: "The credit goes to Mary Tooze for making the recording possible, to Niel for his fine playing and to Tomas for writing such a wonderful piece. I am thrilled for everyone concerned." Svoboda said of the nomination: "The prestige goes to the orchestra. This is a great moment for our symphony." The Oregon Symphony's director of public relations commented: "The running joke is that forever more, the name of this organization is 'The Grammy-nominated Oregon Symphony Orchestra.' The Grammy acknowledgment is recognized as a mark of great artistic achievement. To be nominated is about as good as it gets."

Selected tracks from the album have been broadcast by classical music radio stations. Concerto for Marimba and Orchestra was aired by WFMT (Chicago) in March 2012, WWFM (Trenton, New Jersey) in September 2013, and KUAF (Fayetteville, Arkansas) in November 2013. Symphony No. 1 was broadcast by Interlochen Public Radio in August 2012 and by WRTI (Philadelphia) in November 2013. WNYC (New York City) has aired the marimba concerto and Symphony No. 1 as recently as January 2011 and January 2014, respectively.

Track listing
All works by Tomáš Svoboda.

 Overture of the Season, Op. 89 – 8:42

 Concerto for Marimba and Orchestra, Op. 148
 "Con moto" – 8:48
 "Adagio" – 8:08
 "Vivace" – 8:39

 Symphony No. 1 (of Nature), Op. 20
 "Moderato" – 10:08
 "Presto" – 8:13
 "Andante" – 6:56
 "Allegro – Moderato" – 10:18

Track listing adapted from the album's liner notes.

Personnel

 Blanton Alspaugh – producer
 Susan Bush – executive producer
 Niel DePonte – marimba
 James DePreist – conductor
 Mark Donahue – mastering
 Henry Hillman – photography
 Pavlina Honcova-Summers – photography
 Peter Kermani – executive producer
 Wendy Lehrer	– photography
 Dave McLaughlin – graphic design
 John Newton – engineer
 Oregon Symphony – orchestra
 Mark B. Rulison – executive producer
 Tomás Svoboda – composer, cover photo 

Credits adapted from AllMusic.

Orchestra roster

 Clarisse Atcherson – first violin
 Aida Baker – first violin
 Kenneth Baldwin – assistant principal bass
 David Bamonte – trumpet
 Joēl Belgique – principal viola
 Joseph Berger – associate principal horn
 Heather Blackburn – second violin***
 Ronald Blessinger – first violin
 Naomi Blumberg – cello
 David Brubaker – first violin
 Pansy Chang – cello
 JáTtik Clark – principal tuba
 Julie Coleman – second violin
 Robin Cook – first violin*
 John Cox – principal horn
 Jennifer Craig – principal harp
 Dolores D'Aigle – assistant principal second violin
 Dan Alan Danielson – second violin****
 Juan de Gomar – bassoon, contrabassoon
 Eileen Deiss – first violin
 Niel DePonte – principal percussion
 Frank Diliberto – principal bass
 Jonathan Dubay – first violin
 Cheri Ann Egbers – clarinet
 Mark Eubanks – principal bassoon
 Daniel Ge Feng – second violin
 Kenneth Finch – cello
 Lynne Finch – second violin
 Kathleen Follett – first violin*
 Michael Foxman – concertmaster, first violin
 Leah Frajola – second violin
 Peter Frajola – associate concertmaster, first violin
 Katherine George – principal keyboard
 Mary Grant – horn
 Kathryn Gray – first violin
 Paloma Griffin – assistant concertmaster, first violin
 Lisa Hansen – second violin
 Philip Neil Hatler – trombone*
 Donald Hermanns – bass
 John Hubbard – second violin***
 Denise Huizenga – second violin****
 Gyrid Hyde-Towle – second violin
 Marty Jennings – first violin***
 Jeffrey Johnson – bass
 Lawrence Johnson – assistant principal horn
 Mary Ann Coggins Kaza – first violin
 Bridget Kelly – cello
 Frederick Korman – principal oboe
 Sally Kuhns – assistant principal trumpet
 Todd Kuhns – clarinet, E-flat clarinet/bass clarinet
 Eileen Lande – second violin
 Steve Lawrence – percussion
 Ann Leeder-Beesley – second violin
 Nancy Lochner – viola
 Marlene Majovski – first violin
 Virginia McCarthy – second violin
 Stephanie McDougal – cello
 Patricia Miller – viola
 Robert Naglee – bassoon
 Yoshinori Nakao – principal clarinet
 Charles Noble – assistant principal viola
 Gayle Budd O'Grady – cello
 William Ofstad – bass
 Harris Orem – English horn, oboe
 Barton Parker – horn
 Christine Perry – percussion
 Jeffrey Peyton – percussion***
 Alan Pierce – bass trombone, trombone
 Deloris Plum – cello
 Stephen Price – viola
 Brian Quincey – viola
 Paul Salvatore – principal timpani
 Fred Sautter – principal trumpet
 Anna Schaum – viola
 Jason Schooler – bass
 Timothy Scott – cello
 Burke Shaw – bass
 Michael Sigell – second violin
 Deborah Singer – first violin
 David Socolofsky – assistant principal cello
 Rachel Sokolow – first violin
 Tomáš Svoboda – keyboard
 Peggy Swafford – viola
 Chien Tan – principal second violin
 Margo Tatgenhorst – principal cello
 Robert Taylor – principal trombone
 Tommy Thompson – bass
 Karen Wagner – oboe
 Martha Warrington – viola
 Dawn Weiss – principal flute
 Connie Whelan – viola
 Leo Whitlow – viola*
 Carol Williams – horn***
 Carla Wilson – piccolo

Orchestra roster adapted from the album's liner notes.

"*" designates acting orchestra members; "**" designates musicians on a leave of absence; "***" designates extra musicians; "****" designates contract musicians.

See also

 2003 in classical music
 List of compositions by Tomáš Svoboda

References

Further reading

External links
 
 Tomas Svoboda, Oregon Symphony
 Tomas Svoboda: "Orchestral Works", Albany Records
 Tomas Svoboda – Recordings: "Orchestral Works", TomasSvoboda.com

2000s in Portland, Oregon
2003 classical albums
2003 in Oregon
Albums produced by Blanton Alspaugh
Albums recorded at the Arlene Schnitzer Concert Hall
Oregon Symphony albums